Alexey Alexandrovich Semyonov (born April 15, 1949) is a Russian professional association football coach and a former player who currently works as a head scout for FC Rubin Kazan.

Semyonov played in the Soviet First League with FC Avanhard Zhovti Vody, FC Dnipro Dnipropetrovsk, FC Kryvbas Kryvyi Rih and FC Rubin Kazan.

External links
Profile at Footballfacts.ru

1949 births
Living people
Russian footballers
Soviet footballers
FC Dnipro players
FC Kryvbas Kryvyi Rih players
FC Rubin Kazan players
Soviet football managers
FC Rubin Kazan managers
Association football goalkeepers